Sture Hållberg (June 11, 1917 – June 8, 1988) was a Swedish boxer who competed in the 1936 Summer Olympics.

In 1936 he was eliminated in the first round of the flyweight class after losing his fight to Raoul Degryse.

External links
profile

1917 births
1988 deaths
Flyweight boxers
Olympic boxers of Sweden
Boxers at the 1936 Summer Olympics
Swedish male boxers
20th-century Swedish people